William Parker Caldwell (November 8, 1832 – June 7, 1903) was an American politician and a member of the United States House of Representatives for the 9th congressional district of Tennessee.

Biography
Caldwell was born in Christmasville in Carroll County, Tennessee, on November 8, 1832. He attended school at McLemoresville, Tennessee, and at Princeton, Kentucky. He studied law at Cumberland School of Law at Cumberland University in Lebanon, Tennessee, and was admitted to the bar in 1853.

Career
Caldwell practiced in Dresden and Union City, Tennessee. He served in the Tennessee House of Representatives from 1857 to 1859. He was a presidential elector on the Democratic ticket of Douglas and Johnson in 1860. He was a delegate to the Democratic National Convention in 1868. When the town of Gardner, Tennessee, incorporated in 1869, he became its first mayor.

Elected as a Democrat to the Forty-fourth and Forty-fifth Congresses, he served from March 4, 1875, to March 3, 1879. He was not a candidate for re-election to the Forty-sixth Congress in 1878. He resumed the practice of law in Gardner, Tennessee, and served in the Tennessee Senate from 1891 to 1893.

Death
Caldwell died in Gardner, Tennessee on June 7, 1903 (age 70 years, 211 days). He is interred at Caldwell Cemetery. His house in Gardner is listed on the National Register of Historic Places.

References

External links

Democratic Party members of the Tennessee House of Representatives
Mayors of places in Tennessee
Democratic Party Tennessee state senators
1832 births
1903 deaths
People from Carroll County, Tennessee
Democratic Party members of the United States House of Representatives from Tennessee
19th-century American politicians